Filip Kurto (born 14 June 1991) is a Polish professional footballer who plays as a goalkeeper for the A-League Men club Macarthur FC.

Club career
Kurto began his career when he was 7 years old at Naki Olsztyn. In 2005, he moved to OKS 1945 Olsztyn youth team. In 2006 Kurto joined Warmia Olsztyn. In 2007, he moved to Promień Opalenica. In the 2008–09 season he played regularly for the Promień first squad in the Polish Third League. In December 2008, he was invited by Wisła Kraków for a trial. In March 2009, he moved to Wisła Kraków. In July 2009 Kurto signed a new three-year contract with Wisła Kraków. In July 2013, Kurto moved to Dutch side Roda JC Kerkrade on a free transfer. In September 2013, Kurto scored an own goal during a 3–3 draw against FC Utrecht in the Eredivisie. He was released in July 2014 and signed with FC Dordrecht later on. After the relegation of FC Dordrecht, Kurto found a new Eredivisie club in Excelsior.

Wellington Phoenix

On 18 July 2018, it was announced that Kurto had signed a two-year deal with New Zealand club Wellington Phoenix who play in the A-League. After consolidating his starting position at the club, on 2 December 2018 Kurto suffered a serious head injury following a collision with Perth Glory striker Andy Keogh.

Western United
On 14 May 2019 it was announced that Kurto was leaving the Phoenix to join new A-League club Western United.

Macarthur FC 
On 26 October 2021, Kurto signed for Macarthur FC.

International career
Kurto made his debut for the Poland national under-18 football team on 24 March 2009 in a match against Portugal. On 13 August 2009 he played his first match for Poland national under-19 football team.

In August 2010 he earned his first call-up to Poland national under-20 football team for the friendly matches against Uzbekistan and Italy.

Statistics
 (correct as of 21 November 2021)

Honours
Wisła Kraków
Ekstraklasa: 2010–11

Macarthur
Australia Cup: 2022

Individual
A-Leagues All Star: 2022

References

External links
 Voetbal International profile 
 

1991 births
Living people
Sportspeople from Olsztyn
Polish footballers
Polish expatriate footballers
Poland youth international footballers
Poland under-21 international footballers
Wisła Kraków players
Roda JC Kerkrade players
FC Dordrecht players
Excelsior Rotterdam players
Wellington Phoenix FC players
Western United FC players
Macarthur FC players
Ekstraklasa players
Eredivisie players
Expatriate footballers in the Netherlands
Expatriate soccer players in Australia
A-League Men players
Association football goalkeepers